John Trotter (died 1856) was a British Conservative politician.

He held the seat until 1847 when he did not seek re-election.

He died on 31 August 1856, aged 77 at the family home, Horton Manor, Epsom.

References

External links
 

1856 deaths
1780 births
UK MPs 1837–1841
UK MPs 1841–1847
Conservative Party (UK) MPs for English constituencies